Hyman Abramovitz (May 1, 1901 – after June 1962) was an American businessman, Boston mobster, and high-ranking member under Charles "King" Solomon during Prohibition.

Biography
Abbrams started out as a restaurateur in Boston. He was of Jewish descent. Abbrams and other members of Solomon's organization took over Boston's criminal operations for themselves following Solomon's murder in 1933. He would later become involved in financing syndicate controlled casinos with Meyer Lansky, specifically the Flamingo and later the Sands with Carl Cohen and Jack Entratter. In 1957, he partnered with Moe Dalitz, Morris Kleinman, Sam Tucker, Wilbur Clark (of the Desert Inn and Lansky's Hotel Nacional casino), Ed Levinson (of the Fremont Hotel and Casino), Charles "Babe" Baron (who represented Sam Giancana), and Morris Rosen (of the Flamingo  Hotel) to build the Hotel Habbana Riviera casino in Havana.

He was married to Harriet Janice Allison, a dancer in Las Vegas.

Further reading 
 Fried, Albert. The Rise and Fall of the Jewish Gangster in America. New York: Holt, Rinehart and Winston, 1980. 
 Messick, Hank. Lansky. London: Robert Hale & Company, 1973. 
Reid, Ed and Demaris, Ovid. The Green Felt Jungle. Montreal: Pocket Books, 1964.
Schwartz, Rosalie. Pleasure Island: Tourism and Temptation in Cuba. U of Nebraska Press, 1997.

References 

Fox, Stephen. Blood and Power: Organized Crime in Twentieth-Century America. New York: William Morrow and Company, 1989.

External links
 "Mr. Mob: The Life and Crimes of Moe Dalitz" - Google Books
 "The business of crime: Italians and syndicate crime in the United States" - Google Books
 "The Jewish body" - Google Books

Jewish American gangsters
People from Boston
1901 births
Year of death missing
Place of birth missing
Place of death missing
20th-century American criminals
American real estate businesspeople
American restaurateurs
American casino industry businesspeople
Emigrants from the Russian Empire to the United States